Bjarne Rudolf Alexander Westermarck (15 January 1887, Helsinki – 18 September 1945) was a Finnish politician. He was a Member of the Parliament of Finland from 1922 to 1923, representing the Agrarian League.

References

1887 births
1945 deaths
Politicians from Helsinki
People from Uusimaa Province (Grand Duchy of Finland)
Swedish-speaking Finns
Centre Party (Finland) politicians
Members of the Parliament of Finland (1922–24)